is the second studio album by Japanese actress and recording artist Takako Matsu. It was released on September 23, 1998, through Arista Records Japan. The album peaked at number 3 on the Oricon Albums Chart and was certified Gold by the RIAJ for shipment of 200,000 copies. The album has sold about 245,000 copies in Japan, as of June 2014.

Reception
CD Journal called the album "high standard" and commented that Ai no Tobira suggests Matsu's growth as an artist. The album peaked at number 3 on the Oricon Albums Chart and stayed in the top 20 for 9 weeks. It has sold about 245,000 copies in Japan and has been certified Gold by the RIAJ for shipment of 200,000 copies.

Track listing
All songs arranged by Satoshi Takebe.

Source:

Charts and certifications

Charts

Certifications

References

 

1998 albums
Takako Matsu albums